Volmerange-les-Mines (German: Wollmeringen; Lorraine Franconian: Wuelmeréngen/Wollmeréng) is a commune in the region of Moselle department in Grand Est in north-eastern France.

It lies on the international border with Luxembourg, with the settlement being almost contiguous with the Luxembourgish town of Dudelange.

Twin towns — sister cities
Volmerange-les-Mines is twinned with:

  Calusco d'Adda, Italy 
  Saint-Genest-d'Ambière, France

See also
 Communes of the Moselle department

References

External links
 

Volmerangelesmines